This article is about the particular significance of the year 1997 to Wales and its people.

Incumbents
Secretary of State for Wales – William Hague (until 3 May); Ron Davies
Archbishop of Wales – Alwyn Rice Jones, Bishop of St Asaph
Archdruid of the National Eisteddfod of Wales – Dafydd Rowlands

Events
15 January - Diana, Princess of Wales calls for an international ban on landmines.
21 January - Wales child abuse scandal: Over eighty people are named as child abusers in care homes in North Wales.
March - Launch of the "Welsh Language in Chubut" project.
13 March - Launch of the Aberystwyth Centre for the Book.
1 May - In the UK general election, four female MPs are elected in Wales -- Julie Morgan, Ann Clwyd, Betty Williams and Jackie Lawrence. Lembit Öpik becomes MP for Montgomeryshire.
24 May - Robert Hardy officially opens the Judge's Lodging museum in Presteigne.
31 August - Newsreader Martyn Lewis announces the death of Diana, Princess of Wales.
1 September - The Prince of Wales flies to Paris to bring home the body of his ex-wife. Bodyguard Trevor Rees-Jones, the only survivor of the crash in which Diana died, remains in a critical condition.
6 September - At the funeral of the former Princess of Wales, her coffin is carried into Westminster Abbey by a contingent of Welsh Guards.
18 September - The referendum on Welsh devolution results in a narrow "Yes" vote.
13 October - First section of the restored Welsh Highland Railway (60 cm (2 ft) gauge) officially opens over 5 km (3 mi) of former standard gauge trackbed between Caernarfon and Dinas.
date unknown
Alun Hoddinott receives the Glyndwr Award for an Outstanding Contribution to the Arts in Wales.
Bryn Euryn, an archaeological site near Colwyn Bay, is identified as the probable base of Cynlas Goch, a 6th-century king.
Cardiff Arms Park is demolished to make way for a new stadium.
Welsh Sheepdog Society is founded.
Jenny Pride becomes the first Welsh female to command a unit of the Royal Engineers.

Arts
Sir Harry Secombe suffers a stroke.
October - The Red Violin festival is held for the first time in Cardiff.

Awards
Glyndŵr Award - Alun Hoddinott
National Eisteddfod of Wales - held in Bala
Chair - Ceri Wyn Jones, "Gwaddol"
Crown - Cen Williams, "Branwen"
Prose Medal - Angharad Tomos, Y Canol Llonydd
Gwobr Goffa Daniel Owen - Gwyneth Carey
Richard Burton Prize - Rhys ap Trefor
Welsh Arts Council Book of the Year - Iwan Llwyd, Dan Ddylanwad (Under the Influence)

Books
Rees Davies - The Revolt of Owain Glyn Dŵr
Dai Jones - Fi Dai Sy' 'Ma
Angharad Tomos - Wele'n Gwawrio
Gerwyn Williams - Cydio’n Dynn

Music
L'Héritage des Celtes, featuring Elaine Morgan - Finisterre
Bryn Terfel makes his debut at La Scala as Figaro.

Albums
Acrimony - Tumuli Shroomaroom
Manic Street Preachers - Everything Live
Stereophonics release their first album, Word Gets Around.
Gorky's Zygotic Mynci - Barafundle
Iwcs a Doyle - Edrychiad Cynta’

Film
Ioan Gruffudd and Bernard Fox appear in the blockbuster Titanic.
Michael Sheen stars in Wilde.
Horror film Darklands is filmed in Port Talbot.

Broadcasting

English-language television
Visions of Snowdonia with Iolo Williams

Welsh-language television
Ffermio
Pam Fi Duw? starring Brian Hibbard
Tylluan Wen starring John Ogwen
Y Clwb Rygbi

Sport

BBC Wales Sports Personality of the Year – Scott Gibbs
Boxing:
11 October - Joe Calzaghe beats Chris Eubank to become the Super Middleweight World Champion.
19 December - Barry Jones beats Wilson Palacio to become the WBO Super featherweight Champion.
Cricket - Glamorgan win the County Championship.

Births
3 January - Joe Morrell, footballer
23 January - Shaheen Jafargholi, singer and actor
22 March - Harry Wilson, footballer
24 March - George Thomas, footballer
15 May - Maisie Potter, snowboarder

Deaths
January - Alan Taylor, TV presenter, 72
10 March - Wilf Wooller, cricketer, rugby player, journalist and sports administrator, 84
2 June - Eddie Thomas, boxing champion and manager, 70
10 July - Ivor Allchurch, footballer, 67
16 July - Ron Berry, writer, 77
2 August - Rhydwen Williams, poet, novelist, and minister, 80
20 August - Bernard Cowey, Wales international rugby union player, 85
30 August - Gwilym Tilsley, poet and archdruid, 86
31 August (in Paris) - Diana, Princess of Wales, 36
22 September - George Thomas, 1st Viscount Tonypandy, former Speaker of the House of Commons, 88
6 November - Ray Daniel, footballer, 69
13 November - Alexander Cordell, novelist, 83
15 November - Alf Day, footballer, 90
16 November - Aubrey Edwards, cricketer, 79
28 December - Ronnie Williams, actor and comedian, 58
date unknown
David Gwerfyl Davies, organist and composer
Douglas Jones, footballer
Reg Parker, footballer

See also
1997 in Northern Ireland

References

 
Wales